Madalena is a Portuguese parish in the municipality of Vila Nova de Gaia. Famous for its beaches, the parish makes border with the Atlantic Ocean and only a couple of miles close to Rio Douro. Due to its geographical location, the inhabitants can enjoy considerable sunshine duration all year with warm weather. It is a historical place over 800 years old with deep agricultural traditions and fishing practices.

The population in 2011 was 10,040, in an area of 4.69 km².

Media
Notícias da Madalena is a free, quarterly regional newspaper that informs readers of the goings-on in Madalena.

References

Freguesias of Vila Nova de Gaia